The 2000 Virginia Tech Hokies football team represented Virginia Polytechnic Institute and State University during the 2000 NCAA Division I-A football season. Virginia Tech competed as a member of the Big East Conference. The Hokies were led by Frank Beamer in his 14th year as head coach.

Regular season
Michael Vick's 2000 season did have its share of highlights, such as his career rushing high of 210 yards against the Boston College Eagles in Chestnut Hill, Massachusetts. Against West Virginia in the Black Diamond Trophy game, Vick accounted for 288 total yards of offense and two touchdowns in a 48–20 win.  The following week, Vick led the Hokies back from a 14–0 deficit against Syracuse at the Carrier Dome—where the Hokies had not won since 1986.  Vick put the game away with a 55-yard run with 1:34 left.

The following game against Pittsburgh, Vick was injured and had to miss the rest of that game, the entire game against , and was unable to start against the Miami Hurricanes—the Hokies' lone loss of the season.  Vick's final game at Virginia Tech came against the Clemson Tigers in the 2001 Gator Bowl, where he was named MVP of the game.

The opening game on August 27 against Georgia Tech was postponed due to lightning and then canceled due to an unplayable field.

Schedule

Roster

Rankings

Games summaries

Akron

at East Carolina

Rutgers

at Boston College

Temple

West Virginia

at Syracuse

Pittsburgh

at Miami (FL)

at UCF

Virginia

vs. Clemson (Gator Bowl)

2000 team players in the NFL
The following players were drafted into professional football following the season.

References

Virginia Tech
Virginia Tech Hokies football seasons
Gator Bowl champion seasons
Virginia Tech Hokies football